Lac Unique is a Canadian rural community in Madawaska County, New Brunswick.

On Lac Unique, it is mostly a summer retreat for most campgoers, although some have elected to live here year long. In July, the community hosts a Christmas in July weekend where fun is had by all.
Impressive sunsets are witnessed in the summer months.

Maple Sugar Camp
Lac Unique is most notable for its maple sugar camp. With less than 10 full-time employees, it is not large by normal standards, but large in the sense that it produces maple sugar products used throughout northwestern New Brunswick and northern Maine.

The lakeside camp allows school classes from schools in Maine and New Brunswick to take field trips for touring the facility and observe the "sugaring off" of maple sap; visitors are permitted almost unlimited samples of freshly refined syrup poured over snow and then rolled up on popsicle sticks to harden in the cool air.

Other products available include jugs of syrup, syrup-filled ice cream cones, blocks of hard maple sugar and maple cream spreads.

History

Notable people

See also
List of communities in New Brunswick

References
 

Communities in Madawaska County, New Brunswick